Thomas Moryson or Morrison (died 19 February 1592), of Cadeby, Lincolnshire, was a 16th-century English politician who sat as MP for Grimsby from 1572 until 1589.

The son of George Moryson, of Waltham, Lincolnshire, in 1555, he became Commissioner for Sewers of Cambridgeshire, Huntingdonshire, the Isle of Ely, Lincolnshire, Northamptonshire and Nottinghamshire. He was granted a Crown lease or 21 years of lands near Grimsby in 1559 and in 1561 acquired the manor of Beesby, Lincolnshire. Appointed a Justice of the Peace for Lindsey in 1564, by 1569, he was Deputy Clerk to Christopher Smith at the Exchequer.

Elected Member of Parliament for Grimsby in 1572, he became Mayor of Great Grimsby in 1576, and Clerk of the Pipe by January 1579. Lord Burghley nominated him as a Bencher of Gray's Inn on 28 February 1584 and he was returned to Parliament representing Grimsby until 1589.

He married in 1559 Elizabeth, daughter of Thomas Moigne, of Willingham, Lindsey, Lincolnshire. They had two daughters and five sons of whom Richard Moryson was a soldier and MP, and Fynes Moryson was a writer and historian.

See also
Morrison baronets

References  

Year of birth missing
1592 deaths
English MPs 1572–1583
English MPs 1584–1585
English MPs 1586–1587
English MPs 1589
Mayors of Grimsby
Commissioners for sewers
Members of the Parliament of England for Great Grimsby
Thomas